Alexander Lange Johnson (26 October 1910 – 20 April 1989) was a Norwegian priest, resistance member during World War II, bishop of Hamar, and biographer. He was born in Antsirabe, Madagascar. He played a leading role in the Norwegian civil resistance during the German occupation of Norway, being a member of the Coordination Committee, and later also Hjemmefrontens Ledelse. He was a bishop of the diocese of Hamar from 1964 to 1974. He wrote a biography on Eivind Berggrav in 1959.

Johnson completed his examen artium in 1928 at Oslo Cathedral School before studying theology at the University of Oslo, where he graduated in 1933.

Selected bibliography
 (1939) 
 (1940)
 (1959) 
 (1984)

References

1910 births
1989 deaths
Norwegian resistance members
Bishops of Hamar
Norwegian biographers
Male biographers
People educated at Oslo Cathedral School
University of Oslo alumni
People from Antsirabe
20th-century Norwegian historians
20th-century biographers
20th-century Norwegian male writers